Hexokinase deficiency is an anemia-causing condition associated with inadequate hexokinase. Specifically, the HK1 isozyme is involved.

An acronym for hexokinase deficiency is HK deficiency, and it is a genetic disease. The person must be homozygous for the trait, as being heterozygous would just make the person a carrier of that mutated gene.

The cause of hexokinase deficiency is linked to mutations of the HK gene and the encoding of the HK enzyme. The result of the mutations lead to reduction in HK activity.

See also
 List of hematologic conditions

References

External links 

Hereditary hemolytic anemias
Inborn errors of carbohydrate metabolism